Live Trek 1985 - 1986 is a live album by American post-punk band Savage Republic, released in 1987 by Fundamental Records.

Track listing

Personnel
Adapted from the Live Trek 1985 - 1986 liner notes.

Savage Republic
 Mark Erskine – instruments
 Thom Furhmann – instruments
 Greg Grunke – instruments
 Bruce Licher – instruments, design
 Robert Loveless – instruments
 Ethan Port – instruments

Production and additional personnel
 Annabelle Staunton – photography

Release history

References

External links 
 

1987 live albums
Savage Republic albums